This is a list of current ambassadors from Finland. Note that some ambassadors are responsible for more than one country while others are directly accredited from Helsinki or other capital city.

Current ambassadors to other countries

Africa

Asia

Oceania

Europe

North America and  the Caribbean

South America

Current ambassadors to international organisations

See also
List of ambassadors of Finland (current and former)

References

External links 
 Ministry of Foreign Affairs of Finland
 Embassy of Finland in Kabul, Afghanistan
 Embassy of Finland in Buenos Aires, Argentina
 Embassy of Finland in Canberra, Australia
 Embassy of Finland in Brussels, Belgium
 Embassy of Finland in Brasília, Brazil
 Embassy of Finland in Santiago de Chile, Chile
 Embassy of Finland in Cairo, Egypt
 Embassy of Finland in Athens, Greece
 Embassy of Finland in New Delhi, India
 Embassy of Finland in Jakarta, Indonesia
 Embassy of Finland in The Hague, Netherlands
 Embassy of Finland in Manila, Philippines
 Embassy of Finland in Pretoria, South Africa
 Embassy of Finland in Seoul, South Korea
 Embassy of Finland in Madrid, Spain
 Embassy of Finland in Dar es Salaam, Tanzania
 Embassy of Finland in Abu Dhabi, United Arab Emirates
Embassy of Finland in the United States of America

 
Finland
ambassadors of Finland